The Secret Agent is a 1992 drama miniseries in three parts, made for the BBC. Directed by David Drury, it is the television adaptation of the 1907 novel The Secret Agent by Joseph Conrad. Starring David Suchet, Cheryl Campbell, and Peter Capaldi, it was first shown in the United Kingdom from 28 October to 11 November 1992. In the U.S. it was the final production introduced for Masterpiece Theatre by host Alistair Cooke.

Plot
The mostly inactive spy Alfred Verloc is ordered by his superior Mr Vladimir to carry out a terrorist act. Verloc reluctantly plans the operation, seeking help from The Professor. Verloc is also an informant for the police and the Assistant Commissioner and Chief Inspector Heat add additional pressure on Verloc and his attempts to carry out his plan. Verloc’s subsequent actions gravely affect his wife who is devoted to her mentally unbalanced brother Stevie.

Cast
David Suchet as Alfred Verloc
Cheryl Campbell as Winnie Verloc
Peter Capaldi as Mr. Vladimir
Warren Clarke as Chief Inspector Heat
Patrick Malahide as The Assistant Commissioner
Janet Suzman as Margaret, Duchess of Chester
Richard Sterling as Stevie
John Benfield as Michaelis
Alfred Lynch as The Professor
Stratford Johns as The Home Secretary
David Ryan as Wurme
Doreen Mantle as Mrs. Waller
David Schofield as Ossipon

Reception
A contemporary review in The Los Angeles Times described the production positively, writing, "striking performances by both Suchet and Campbell, with the usual support from a clutch of good British character actors, are excellent reasons to keep watching. Another is the way this meticulously detailed psychological drama juxtaposes settings, from the fashionable salons of the upper crust to Verloc's own squalid shopkeeper's digs, as the battle between the empowered and the unempowered leads to an inevitable result." Hoyt Hilsman of Variety called the adaptation "finely drawn, yet somber and slow-paced. Acting is excellent and strong on character, but it has little dramatic story interest."

See also
Sabotage (1936)
The Secret Agent (1996)
The Secret Agent (2016, TV miniseries)

References

External links
 
"David Suchet Doing Double Duty". The Washington Post

1992 British television series debuts
1992 British television series endings
1990s British drama television series
BBC television dramas
1990s British television miniseries
English-language television shows
Espionage television series
Television shows based on British novels
Films directed by David Drury
Films based on works by Joseph Conrad
Television shows based on works by Joseph Conrad